Duirinish railway station is a remote railway station on the Kyle of Lochalsh Line near the settlement of Duirinish in the Highlands, northern Scotland. ScotRail, who manage the station, operate all services here.

History

The station was built by the Kyle of Lochalsh Extension (Highland Railway) between Stromeferry and Kyle of Lochalsh, opening on 2 November 1897.

Facilities 
Facilities here, like many other stations on the line, are incredibly basic, consisting just of a shelter, a help point, some bike racks and a bench, although the station does have step-free access. As there are no facilities to purchase tickets, passengers must buy one in advance, or from the guard on the train.

Passenger volume 

The statistics cover twelve month periods that start in April.

Services 

Four trains each way call (on request) on weekdays and Saturdays. On Sundays, there is only one train each way, plus a second from May to late September only.

References

Bibliography

External links

 RAILSCOT on Dingwall and Skye Railway
 RAILSCOT on Kyle of Lochalsh Extension (Highland Railway)

Railway stations in Highland (council area)
Railway stations served by ScotRail
Railway stations in Great Britain opened in 1897
Former Highland Railway stations
Railway request stops in Great Britain